Trinity Episcopal Church is an Episcopal church located in Santa Barbara, California.

History
The church was founded in 1866 by the second protestant denomination in Santa Barbara, with the lot, located on the first block of East Gutierrez Street, used for construction being donated by parishioner Dr. Samuel Brinkerhoff in the 1850s. The church had to be relocated in 1887 to the corner of East Anacapa and Anapamu Streets after the Southern Pacific Railroad laid tracks down the middle of Gutierrez Street, causing copious amounts of noise, smoke and dust. The new church, built with redwood and a 120-foot steeple, stood for the next 16 years until a fire destroyed it on December 20, 1903. In 1912, the church raised $54,000 to build a new church on the corner of State and Micheltorena Streets. The church, designed by Philip Hubert Frohman and Harold Martin, was built with load-bearing stone and a steel-reinforced rubble and mortar core and was completed in 1919. In February 2019, the church became a City of Santa Barbara Historic Landmark.

See also  
 City of Santa Barbara Historic Landmarks

References

Buildings and structures in Santa Barbara, California
Episcopal church buildings in California
1866 establishments in California
Stone churches in the United States